La Fureur is a French music game show, first aired by France 2 on 31 December 1995.

Created by French television personality Arthur, the show features two teams of celebrity contestants, segregated by gender, playing various music-related games and stunts. One notable element of La Fureur is its karaoke feature, where viewers at home are invited to sing along with the contestants, and even musical guests, by singing to the lyrics displayed on the screen.

After its short run on France 2, TF1 picked up the series later in 1996, and carried it through December 31, 2000. Arthur was the host for both the France 2 and TF1 series. Many episodes are generally 120 to 145 minutes in length.

The show was revived by music channel W9 in 2007, as La Fureur, le retour. Alexandre Devoise was the host of this new version. Unlike the original run, le retour does not include a karaoke feature—only questions pertaining to music.

International versions

References

External links
 La Fureur: Le Retour (W9) 

1996 French television series debuts
2000 French television series endings
2007 French television series debuts
French game shows
Musical game shows
Karaoke television series
1990s game shows
2000s game shows